The Bloom Tour is the fourth headlining concert tour by Australian singer Troye Sivan, in support of his sophomore album, Bloom (2018). It began on 21 September 2018 in Irving, United States and ended on 30 November 2019 in Chengdu, China.

Background
On 28 May 2018, Sivan announced the North American leg. The leg was set to feature German singer and songwriter Kim Petras as the main opening act with American singer-songwriters Leland and Carlie Hanson in selected dates. The presale tickets went on sale on 5 June through Sivan's official app. Latin American leg featured festival appearances during Lollapalooza in Argentina, Chile and Brazil. Two sideshow dates were announced in Buenos Aires and São Paulo. The European leg dates was announced on 19 November 2018, followed by the tickets sale four days later. The Asian legs was announced on 14 February 2019. The Australian and New Zealand leg was announced on 21 June 2019, with tickets on sale on 28 June 2019. Three additional dates in China were announced on 24 September 2019, with tickets on sale on 30 September 2019.

Critical reception
Reviewing for the opening night in Irving, Isabel Arcellana of Dallas Observer praised Sivan's stage presence and vocal performance but criticized the set that "could have been more original" and long breaks between wardrobe change. Eric Webb of Austin360 called Sivan "held his arms open in a joyful celebration of queer identity and love" in his show in Austin. Brittany Spanos of Rolling Stone praised Sivan for "carried himself well on stage, embodying the sweeping, changing emotions of each of his songs with grace". Natalia Manzocco of Now rated the show in Toronto four out of five stars and called it "beautifully and explicitly queer". While reviewing the show in Denver, Tyler Harvey of 303 Magazine praised the set list and called it "merged with emotional, daring and raw authenticity." Olivia Khiel of Atlas Artist Group described the show in Phoenix a joy. Reviewing the show in San Diego, Jahfreen Alam of The Guardian (UCSD) gave it a rate of B and called it "a celebration of youth, growing up and finding yourself".

Rachel Bowles of The Skinny rated the show in Glasgow four of five stars and said Sivan "put his absolute all into forging those precious moments with the crowd." Meliza Sestito of aAh! Magazine described the show in Manchester as "a positive and uplifting experience". Writing for NME, Sophie Williams praised the show and called it as a "communal celebration of what it truly means to be young, queer and free."

Set list
This set list is from the concert on 28 February 2019 in London, England. It is not intended to represent all tour dates.

"Seventeen"
"Bloom"
"Plum"
"Heaven"
"Fools"
"Lucky Strike"
"Wild"
"I'm So Tired..."
"Postcard"
"The Good Side"
"What a Heavenly Way to Die"
"Bite"
"1999"
"Dance to This"
"Animal"

Encore
 "Youth"
 "My My My!"

Notes
''1999'' was added to the setlist starting in New York City.

Tour dates

Cancelled shows

Notes

References

Bloom
Bloom
Bloom